Safe Travels is the third studio album by American power pop band, Jukebox the Ghost. The album was released on June 5, 2012 through Yep Roc Records.

Track listing

Personnel 
Jukebox the Ghost
 Jesse Kristin — Drums, Group Member, Percussion
 Tommy Siegel — Bass, Composer, Group Member, Guitar, Vocals
 Ben Thornewill — Accordion, Composer, Group Member, Keyboards, Piano, Vocals

Production and recording
 Christopher Ferrino — Artwork, Cover Painting
 Elliot Jacobson — Production Assistant
 Jukebox the Ghost — Primary Artist, Producer
 Devin Kerr — Mastering, Mixing
 Dan Romer — Engineer, Mixing, Producer
 Michael Triplett — Design
 Mike Tuccillo — Vocal Engineer
 Christine Valentim — Photography

Additional musicians
 Jonathan Dinklage — Viola, Violin
 Dave Eggar — Cello
 Seth Faulk — Congas
 Meredith McCandless — Drum Engineering, Piano Engineer

Charts

References 

2012 albums
Jukebox the Ghost albums
Yep Roc Records albums